Dongxiang (东乡) may refer to:
China Dongxiang, sportswear company
Dongxiang language, a Mongolic language
Dongxiang people, an ethnic group of the PRC that speaks the Dongxiang language
Dongxiang Autonomous County (东乡族自治县), Linxia Prefecture, Gansu, China
Dongxiang District of Fuzhou City, Jiangxi, China
Dongxiang, Wuxuan County, town in Guangxi, China
Dongxiangshi (东乡氏), a Chinese surname originated from state of Song